Azghan Rural District is in the Central District of Ahar County, East Azerbaijan province, Iran. At the census of 2006, its population was 7,100 in 1,609 households; there were 6,314 inhabitants in 1,688 households at the following census of 2011; and in the most recent census of 2016, the population of the rural district was 6,204 in 1,901 households. The largest of its 27 villages was Azghan, with 1,011 people.

References 

Ahar County

Rural Districts of East Azerbaijan Province

Populated places in East Azerbaijan Province

Populated places in Ahar County